Pickardinella is a monotypic genus of Mexican long-jawed orb-weavers containing the single species, Pickardinella setigera. The species was first described by Frederick Octavius Pickard-Cambridge under the name Leucauge setigera, and was moved to its own genus in 1951. Physically, they resemble members of Opadometa and Leucauge. A female has never been found.

See also
 List of Tetragnathidae species
 Leucauge
 Opadometa

References

Monotypic Araneomorphae genera
Spiders of Mexico
Tetragnathidae